Philip W. Anderson (June 23, 1915 – March 27, 1980) was an American film editor with more than fifty film credits commencing with the 1939 films, Marine Circus and Dark Magic. 

He was nominated for the Academy Award for Best Film Editing for three films: Giant (directed by George Stevens - 1956; with William Hornbeck and Fred Bohanan), Sayonara (directed by Joshua Logan - 1957; with Arthur P. Schmidt), and The Parent Trap (directed by David Swift - 1961). His final credit is for A Man Called Horse (directed by Elliot Silverstein - 1970).

References

American film editors
1915 births
1980 deaths
Artists from New York City
People from Granada Hills, Los Angeles